Daharan (also Romanized as Dahārān; also known a Cherāghābād and Dahārūn) is a village in Deh Kahan Rural District, Aseminun District, Manujan County, Kerman Province, Iran. At the 2006 census, its population was 30, in 5 families.

References 

Populated places in Manujan County